Janne Heikkinen (born 11 April 1976) is a Finnish former volleyball player, a member of Finnish national team in 1993–2009.

Career

Clubs
He started his career in his home town Kajaani with his brother. When he was sixteen years old he moved to Tampere and started study in Varala sport high school. Heikkinen made his debut in Finland volleyball league year 1993. He was seventeen-year-old youth player. He won on his first season in Raision Loimu bronze medal of Finnish Championship. Same year he was in youth World Championships were Finland played history best result, 4. place. After season media chose him best newcomer player in the league. Heikkinen played in Raision Loimu seasons 1993–1998. In his last season he won Finland league champion. After many seasons in Finland volleyball league Heikkinen made professional contract with CV Las Palmas. He was 22 years old and won silver medal of Spanish Championship. In 1999 he signed a contract with Italian team – CUS Torino Pallavolo. Last season in Torino, Heikkinen won with his team Italian A2-Cup silver medal. After two season, in 2001 Heikkinen moved to Greece and started play in Olympiacos Piraeus. He won silver medal of the Champions League and silver of Greek Championship. After one season Heikkinen came back to Italy. He played season 2002–2003 in Italy A1-league. He did not got achievements on Sira Cucine Ancône, so he moved away. In 2003 made contract with Aon hotVolleys Vienna. Season was success to him and his team. They won title of Austrian Champion. Season 2004/2005 Heikkinen played in Alto Bolzano. He did not got there any achievements. He played season 2005/2006 in Martina Franca Volley. In 2006 moved to PlusLiga, to Polish club Skra Bełchatów. He won with Polish team three titles of Polish Champion (2007, 2008, 2009) and two Polish Cups – in 2007 and 2009. In season 2007/2008 won with club bronze medal of Champions League. He ended his career in 2009.

National team
Heikkinen debuted in Finnish national team as 17-year-old player against Croatia in the World Championships qualification. Best result of Finnish team was fourth place in the European Championship 2007.

Sporting achievements

Clubs

CEV Champions League
  2001/2002 – with Olympiacos Piraeus
  2007/2008 – with PGE Skra Bełchatów

National championships
 1993/1994  Finnish Championship, with Raision Loimu
 1996/1997  Finnish Championship, with Raision Loimu
 1998/1999  Spanish Championship, with CV Las Palmas
 2001/2002  Greek Championship, with Olympiacos Piraeus
 2003/2004  Austrian Championship, with Aon hotVolleys Vienna
 2006/2007  Polish Cup, with BOT Skra Bełchatów
 2006/2007  Polish Championship, with BOT Skra Bełchatów
 2007/2008  Polish Championship, with PGE Skra Bełchatów
 2008/2009  Polish Cup, with PGE Skra Bełchatów
 2008/2009  Polish Championship, with PGE Skra Bełchatów

References 

Living people
1976 births
People from Kajaani
Finnish men's volleyball players
Olympiacos S.C. players
Finnish expatriate sportspeople in Spain
Finnish expatriate sportspeople in Italy
Finnish expatriate sportspeople in Greece
Finnish expatriate sportspeople in Austria
Finnish expatriate sportspeople in Poland
Expatriate volleyball players in Poland
Finnish Champions of men's volleyball
Austrian Champions of men's volleyball
Polish Champions of men's volleyball
Skra Bełchatów players
Sportspeople from Kainuu
Expatriate volleyball players in Italy
Expatriate volleyball players in Spain
Expatriate volleyball players in Austria
Expatriate volleyball players in Greece